Thermotoga maritima is a hyperthermophilic, anaerobic organism that is a member of the order Thermotogales. T. maritima is well known for its ability to produce hydrogen (clean energy) and it is the only fermentative bacterium that has been shown to produce Hydrogen more than the Thauer limit (>4 mol H2 /mol glucose).  It employs [FeFe]-hydrogenases to produce hydrogen gas (H2) by fermenting many different types of carbohydrates.

History
First discovered in the sediment of a marine geothermal area near Vulcano, Italy, Thermotoga maritima resides in hot springs as well as hydrothermal vents. Thermotoga maritima is the only bacterium known to grow at this high a temperature; the only other organisms known to live in environments this extreme are members of the domain Archaea. The hyperthermophilic abilities of T. maritima, along with its deep lineage, suggests that it is potentially a very ancient organism.

Physical attributes
Thermotoga maritima is a non-sporulating, rod shaped, gram-negative bacterium. When viewed under a microscope, it can be seen to be encased in a sheath-like envelope which resembles a toga, hence the "toga" in its name.

Metabolism
As an anaerobic fermentative chemoorganotrophic organism, T. maritima catabolizes sugars and polymers and produces carbon dioxide (CO2) and hydrogen (H2) gas as by-products of fermentation. T. maritima is also capable of metabolizing cellulose as well as xylan, yielding H2 that could potentially be utilized as an alternative energy source to fossil fuels. Additionally, this species of bacteria is able to reduce Fe(III) to produce energy using anaerobic respiration. Various flavoproteins and iron-sulphur proteins have been identified as potential electron carriers for use during cellular respiration. However, when growing with sulfur as the final electron acceptor, no ATP is produced. Instead, this process eliminates inhibitory H2 produced from fermentative growth. Collectively, these attributes indicate that T. maritima has become resourceful and capable of metabolizing a host of substances in order to carry out its life processes.

Clean energy (biohydrogen) from T. maritima 
Energy is a growing need of the world and it is expected to grow in the next 20 years.  Among various energy sources, hydrogen serves as the best energy carrier due to its higher energy content per unit weight. T. maritima is one of fermentative bacteria that produces hydrogen to levels that approach the thermodynamic limit (4 mol H2/ mol glucose). However, similar to other fermentative bacteria, the hydrogen yield in this bacterium does not go beyond 4 mol H2 / glucose (Thaeur limit) because of its inherent nature to use more energy for its own cell division to grow rapidly than producing H2. Because of these reasons fermentative bacteria have not been thought to produce higher amounts of hydrogen at a commercial scale. Overcoming this limit by improving the conversion of sugar to H2 could lead to a superior H2 producing biological system that may supersede fossil fuel-based H2 production.

Metabolic engineering in this bacterium led to development of strains of T. maritima that surpassed the Thauer limit of hydrogen production. One of the strains, also known as Tma200, produced 5.77 mol H2/ mol glucose which is the highest yield so far reported in a fermentative bacterium. In this strain, energy redistribution, and metabolic rerouting through the pentose phosphate pathway (PPP) generated excess reductants while uncoupling growth from hydrogen synthesis. Uncoupling of growth from product formation has been viewed as a viable strategy to maximize the product yield which has been achieved in the higher hydrogen producing bacterium. Similar strategies can be adopted for other hydrogen producing bacterium to maximize product yields.

Hydrogenase activity
Hydrogenases are metalloenzymes that catalyze the reversible hydrogen conversion reaction: H2 ⇄ 2 H++ 2 e−. A Group C [FeFe]-hydrogenase from Thermotoga maritima (TmHydS) has showed modest hydrogen conversion activity and reduced sensitivity to the enzyme's inhibitor, CO, in comparison to Group A prototypical and bifurcating [FeFe]-hydrogenases. The TmHydS has a hydrogenase domain with distinct amino acid modifications in the active site pocket, including the presence of a Per-Arnt-Sim (PAS) domain.

Genomic composition
The genome of T. maritima consists of a single circular 1.8 megabase chromosome encoding for 1877 proteins. Within its genome it has several heat and cold shock proteins that are most likely involved in metabolic regulation and response to environmental temperature changes. It shares 24% of its genome with members of the Archaea; the highest percentage overlap of any bacteria. This similarity suggests horizontal gene transfer between Archaea and ancestors of T. maritima and could help to explain why T. maritima is capable of surviving in such extreme temperatures and conditions. The genome of T. maritima has been sequenced multiple times. Genome resequencing of T. maritima MSB8 genomovar DSM3109   determined that the earlier sequenced genome was an evolved laboratory variant of T. maritima with an approximately 8-kb deletion. Moreover, a variety of duplicated genes and direct repeats in its genome suggest their role in intra-molecular homologous recombination leading to genes deletion. A strain with a 10-kb gene deletion has been developed using  the experimental microbial evolution in T. maritima.

Genetic system of Thermotoga maritima
Thermotoga maritima has a great potential in hydrogen synthesis because it can ferment a wide variety of sugars and has been reported to produce the highest amount of H2 (4 mol H2/ mol glucose). Due to lack of a genetic system for the past 30 years majority of the studies have been either focused on heterologous gene expression in E. coli or predicting models since a gene knockout mutant of T. maritima remained unavailable. Developing a genetic system for T. maritima has been a challenging task primarily because of a lack of a suitable heat-stable selectable marker. Recently, the most reliable genetic system based on pyrimidine biosynthesis has been established in T. maritima. This newly developed genetic system relies upon a pyrE− mutant that was isolated after cultivating T. maritima on a pyrimidine biosynthesis inhibiting drug called 5-fluoroorotic acid (5-FOA). The pyrE− mutant is an auxotrophic mutant for uracil. The pyrE from a distantly related genus of T. maritima rescued the uracil auxotrophy of the pyrE− mutant of T. maritima and has been proven to be a suitable marker.

For the first time, the use of this marker allowed the development of an arabinose (araA) mutant of T. maritima. This mutant explored the role of the pentose phosphate pathway of T. maritima  in hydrogen synthesis. The genome of T. maritima possesses direct repeats that have developed into paralogs. Due to lack of a genetic system the true function of these paralogs has remained unknown. Recently developed genetic system in T. maritima has been very useful to determine the function of the ATPase protein (MalK) of the maltose transporter that is present in a multi-copy (three copies) fashion. The gene disruptions of all three putative ATPase encoding subunit (malK) and phenotype have concluded that only one of the three copies serves as an ATPase function of the maltose transporter. It is interesting to know that T. maritima has several paralogs of many genes and the true function of these genes is now dependent upon the use of the recently developed system. The newly developed genetic system in T. maritima has a great potential to make T. maritima as a host for hyperthermophilic bacterial gene expression studies. Protein expression in this model organism is promising to synthesize fully functional protein without any treatment.

Evolution
Thermotoga maritima contains homologues of several competence genes, suggesting that it has an inherent system of internalizing exogenous genetic material, possibly facilitating genetic exchange between this bacterium and free DNA. Based on phylogenetic analysis of the small sub-unit of its ribosomal RNA, it has been recognized as having one of the deepest lineages of Bacteria. Furthermore, its lipids have a unique structure that differs from all other bacteria.

References

External links 
 Thermotoga maritima genome
 Sequenced genome of Thermotoga maritima
 Type strain of Thermotoga maritima at BacDive -  the Bacterial Diversity Metadatabase

Thermotogota
Organisms living on hydrothermal vents
Bacteria described in 1986